Ammassalik Island is an island in the Sermersooq municipality in southeastern Greenland, with an area of .

Geography 
Ammassalik Island is located in the King Christian IX Land region. Separating Ammassalik Island from the mainland of Greenland are the wide Sermilik Fjord in the west and the Ikaasartivaq Strait in the northeast. To the east and southeast, the progressively wider southern half of the Ammassalik Fjord separates the island from the remainder of the eponymous Ammassalik Archipelago. Islands in the archipelago include Kulusuk Island, across the Torsuut Tunoq sound, and Apusiaajik Island, the largest. Ammassalik Island's southern coast borders the Irminger Sea, a marginal sea of the open North Atlantic.

The town of Tasiilaq is located on the island's southeastern side.

Settlements 

The only permanently inhabited settlement on the island is Tasiilaq town on the south coast of the island, with 1,893 inhabitants , the most populous community on the eastern coast, and the seventh-largest town in Greenland.

The research station Sermilik is located 15 km northwest of Tasiilaq on the west coast.

Ammassalik Municipality was a former municipality of Greenland. It is now part of Sermersooq Municipality.

See also
List of islands of Greenland

References

External links 
Map of Ammassalik Island

Islands of Greenland
Cape Farewell Archipelago